How to Have an Accident at Work is a 1959 animated short educational film featuring Donald Duck.  It was released by Walt Disney Productions.

Plot
Donald Duck is very careful at home, but at work that is a different issue as he has multiple accidents. J.J. Fate shows up to inform us how accidents aren't predetermined, but instead are the result of carelessness.

Voice cast
Clarence Nash as Donald Duck
Bill Thompson as J.J. Fate
June Foray as Daisy Duck and Nurse
Lucille Bliss as Donald's son

Home media
The short was released on November 11, 2008 on Walt Disney Treasures: The Chronological Donald, Volume Four: 1951-1961.

References

External links
 
 

1959 films
1959 animated films
1950s Disney animated short films
Donald Duck short films
Films produced by Walt Disney
1950s English-language films
1950s American films
Films scored by Oliver Wallace